Peter Gorley (born 10 July 1951) is an English former professional rugby league footballer who played in the 1970s and 1980s.

Early life, family and education

Gorley was born in Maryport, Cumberland, England.

Playing career

International honours
Peter Gorley won caps for England while at St. Helens in 1980 against Wales, and France (sub), in 1981 against Wales, and won caps for Great Britain while at St. Helens in 1980 against New Zealand, and in 1981 against France, and France (sub).

County honours
Peter Gorley represented Cumbria.

County Cup Final appearances
Peter Gorley played as an interchange/substitute, i.e. number 14, (replacing  William Pattinson) in Workington Town's 11-16 defeat by Widnes in the 1976 Lancashire County Cup Final during the 1976–77 season at Central Park, Wigan on Saturday 30 October 1976, played right-, i.e. number 12, in the 13-10 victory over Wigan in the 1977 Final during the 1977–78 season at Wilderspool Stadium, Warrington on Saturday 29 October 1977, played right-, i.e. number 12, in the 13-15 defeat by Widnes in the 1978 Lancashire County Cup Final during the 1978–79 season at Central Park, Wigan on Saturday 7 October 1978, played right-, i.e. number 12, in St. Helens 0-16 defeat by Warrington in the 1982 Lancashire County Cup Final during the 1982–83 season at Central Park, Wigan on Saturday 23 October 1982, and played right-, i.e. number 10, in the 26-18 victory over Wigan in the 1984 Lancashire County Cup Final during the 1984–85 season at Central Park, Wigan on Sunday 28 October 1984.

Personal life
Peter Gorley is the younger brother of the rugby league footballer, Leslie "Les" Gorley.

References

External links
Peter Gorley statistics at rugbyleagueproject.org
Profile at saints.org.uk
(archived by web.archive.org) » Legends Evening 70's
(archived by web.archive.org) Cumbrians lose Lancashire Cup Final

1951 births
Living people
Cumbria rugby league team players
England national rugby league team players
English rugby league players
Great Britain national rugby league team players
Rugby league players from Maryport
Rugby league second-rows
St Helens R.F.C. players
Whitehaven R.L.F.C. players
Workington Town players